Bakop is a village on the south coast of New Ireland, Papua New Guinea. It is located in Konoagil Rural LLG. The vertical cliffs nearby are said to be "a product of a localised limestone outcrop."

References

Populated places in New Ireland Province